Kinnerly Peak is located in the Livingston Range, Glacier National Park in the U.S. state of Montana. Both peaks are in the remote northwest corner of the park. Kinnerly Peak is the eighth tallest peak in Glacier National Park.

Kinnerly Peak is notable for its huge north face, which rises steeply from Upper Kintla Lake.

The first recorded ascent of Kinnerly Peak was made by a Sierra Club party led by the noted mountaineer Norman Clyde, in 1937. The standard climbing route ascends the northwest face, starting from the south shore of Upper Kintla Lake. It involves a large amount of elevation gain, mostly by scrambling, but with some exposed and mildly technical sections (Class 4 or easy Class 5). Other routes exist on the southeast and southwest faces.

See also
 Mountains and mountain ranges of Glacier National Park (U.S.)

References

Livingston Range
Mountains of Flathead County, Montana
Kinnerly
Mountains of Montana